The 2022 Toyota Owners 400 was a NASCAR Cup Series race held on April 3, 2022, at Richmond Raceway in Richmond, Virginia. Contested over 400 laps on the 0.75 mile (1.2 km) asphalt short track, it was the seventh race of the 2022 NASCAR Cup Series season.

Report

Background

Richmond Raceway is a 3/4-mile (1.2 km), D-shaped, asphalt race track located just outside Richmond, Virginia in Henrico County. It hosts the NASCAR Cup Series and Xfinity Series. Known as "America's premier short track", it formerly hosted a NASCAR Camping World Truck Series race, an IndyCar Series race, and two USAC sprint car races.

Entry list
 (R) denotes rookie driver.
 (i) denotes driver who is ineligible for series driver points.

Practice

Practice results

Qualifying

Qualifying results

Race

Stage Results

Stage One
Laps: 70

Stage Two
Laps: 160

Final Stage Results

Stage Three
Laps: 170

Race statistics
 Lead changes: 13 among 7 different drivers
 Cautions/Laps: 5 for 35
 Red flags: 0
 Time of race: 3 hours, 4 minutes and 43 seconds
 Average speed:

Media

Television
Fox Sports covered their 21st race at the Richmond Raceway. Mike Joy, two-time Richmond winner Clint Bowyer and seven-time NASCAR Cup Series winning crew chief Chad Knaus called the race from the broadcast booth. Jamie Little and Regan Smith handled pit road for the television side. Larry McReynolds and Jamie McMurray provided insight from the Fox Sports studio in Charlotte.

Radio
MRN had the radio call for the race which was simulcasted on Sirius XM NASCAR Radio. Alex Hayden, Jeff Striegle and former crew chief Todd Gordon called the race in the booth when the field raced down the frontstretch. Mike Bagley called the race from a platform inside the backstretch when the field raced down the backstretch. Steve Post and Kim Coon handled pit road for the radio side.

Standings after the race

Drivers' Championship standings

Manufacturers' Championship standings

Note: Only the first 16 positions are included for the driver standings.
. – Driver has clinched a position in the NASCAR Cup Series playoffs.

References

Toyota Owners 400
Toyota Owners 400
Toyota Owners 400
NASCAR races at Richmond Raceway